The 2009 IIHF World Championship rosters consisted of 396 players from 16 national ice hockey teams. Run by the International Ice Hockey Federation (IIHF), the 2009 IIHF World Championship, held in Bern and Zurich-Kloten, Switzerland, was the 73rd edition of the tournament. Russia won the championship, the third time they had done so; it was their 25th championship if it is included with those won by the Soviet Union team.

Before the start of the championship, each participating nation had to submit a list of players for its roster. A minimum of fifteen skaters and two goaltenders and a maximum of twenty skaters and three goaltenders had to be selected. A country that had selected fewer than the maximum allowed must have chosen the remaining players prior to the start of the tournament. After the start of the tournament, each team was allowed to select an additional two players to their roster, for a maximum of 25 players. Once players were registered to the team, they could not be removed from the roster.

To qualify for a national team under IIHF rules, a player must meet several criteria. He must be a citizen of the nation, and be under the jurisdiction of that national association. Players are allowed to switch which national team they play for, providing they fulfill the IIHF criteria. If participating for the first time in an IIHF event, the player would have had to play two consecutive years in the national competition of the new country without playing in another country. If the player has already played for a national team before, he may switch countries if he is a citizen of the new country, and has played for four consecutive years in the national competition of the new country. This switch may happen only once in the player's life.

Ilya Kovalchuk of Russia was named the tournament's most valuable player and top forward by the IIHF directorate. Canadian Shea Weber was named top defenceman and Andrei Mezin of Belarus was selected as top goaltender. Canada's Martin St. Louis and Chris Mason were the tournament's leading scorer and goaltender in save percentage respectively.


Legend

Austria
Head coach:  Lars Bergström (SWE)

Skaters

Goaltenders

Belarus
Head coach:  Glen Hanlon (USA)

Skaters

Goaltenders

Canada
Head coach:  Lindy Ruff (CAN)

Skaters

Goaltenders

Czech Republic
Head coach:  Vladimír Růžička (CZE)

Skaters

Goaltenders

Denmark
Head coach:  Per Bäckman (SWE)

Skaters

Goaltenders

Finland
Head coach:  Jukka Jalonen (FIN)

Skaters

Goaltenders

France
Head coach:  David Henderson (FRA)

Skaters

Goaltenders

Germany
Head coach:  Uwe Krupp (GER)

Skaters

Goaltenders

Hungary
Head coach:  Pat Cortina (CAN)

Skaters

Goaltenders

Latvia
Head coach:  Oļegs Znaroks (GER)

Skaters

Goaltenders

Norway
Head coach:  Roy Johansen (NOR)

Skaters

Goaltenders

Russia
Head coach:  Vyacheslav Bykov (RUS)

Skaters

Goaltenders

Slovakia
Head coach:  Ján Filc (SVK)

Skaters

Goaltenders

Sweden
Head coach:  Bengt-Åke Gustafsson (SWE)

Skaters

Goaltenders

Switzerland
Head coach:  Ralph Krueger (GER)

Skaters

Goaltenders

United States
Head coach:  Ron Wilson (United States)

Skaters

Goaltenders

References

Team rosters

Austria
Belarus
Canada
Czech Republic
Denmark
Finland
France
Germany
Hungary
Latvia
Norway
Russia
Slovakia
Sweden
Switzerland
United States

Player statistics

Austria
Belarus
Canada
Czech Republic
Denmark
Finland
France
Germany
Hungary
Latvia
Norway
Russia
Slovakia
Sweden
Switzerland
United States

rosters
IIHF World Championship rosters